Thomas Ray (born c. 1770, probably in Berkshire; date and place of death unknown) was an English cricketer who played mainly for Berkshire and Middlesex.  He was for many years employed by Marylebone Cricket Club (MCC) as a professional who probably coached the members.

Ray was a good batsman but principally noted for his fielding, which was outstanding.  Ray's known career of 81 major matches was from 1792 to 1811.

References

External sources
 CricketArchive

Further reading
 G B Buckley, Fresh Light on 18th Century Cricket, Cotterell, 1935
 Arthur Haygarth, Scores & Biographies, Volume 1 (1744–1826), Lillywhite, 1862
 H T Waghorn, The Dawn of Cricket, Electric Press, 1906

English cricketers
English cricketers of 1787 to 1825
Berkshire cricketers
Middlesex cricketers
Surrey cricketers
Marylebone Cricket Club cricketers
Non-international England cricketers
London Cricket Club cricketers
Old Westminsters cricketers
1770 births
19th-century deaths
Year of birth uncertain
Year of death unknown